Original Album Classics is a box set compilation by guitarist Joe Satriani, released on June 16, 2008 through Epic Records. It contains five studio albums on separate discs: Not of This Earth (1986), Flying in a Blue Dream (1989), The Extremist (1992), Joe Satriani (1995) and Crystal Planet (1998).

Track listing

References

Joe Satriani compilation albums
2008 compilation albums
Epic Records compilation albums